Luigi Samele may refer to:

 Luigi Samele (fencer) (born 1987), Italian fencer
 Luigi Samele (footballer) (born 2002), Italian footballer